Pre-Cana is a course or consultation for couples preparing to be married in a Catholic church. The name is derived from John 2:1–12, the wedding feast at Cana in Galilee, where Jesus performed the miracle of turning water into wine.

Description
Approaches to Pre-Cana vary among Catholic dioceses and parishes. Often six-month sessions are led by a priest or deacon with support from a married Catholic couple. 

Online programs have emerged as an alternative to gathered events as parishes and dioceses cope with fewer resources, geographically expanding congregations and deployed military couples.

The United States Conference of Catholic Bishops considers the following topics as "must-have conversations" before couples marry:

 Spirituality/faith
 Conflict resolution skills
 Careers
 Finances
 Intimacy/cohabitation
 Children
 Commitment

Other topics that may be covered by Pre-Cana include:

 Ceremony planning
 Family of origin 
 Communication
 Marriage as a sacrament
 Sexuality
 Theology of the Body
 Couple prayer
 Unique challenges of military couples
 Stepfamilies
 Children of divorce

See also

 Christian views on marriage

References

External links 

https://www.youtube.com/live/4NhFcbYrDWo?feature=share

Pre Cana Courses Online
Online Pre-Cana – Living Our Faith in Love
Online Catholic Marriage Prep Class
Catholic Marriage Preparation, LLC
Diocese of Brooklyn 
Engaged Encounter 
Archdiocese of Chicago: Family Ministries Office
CatechismClass.com Online Marriage Prep Program

Pre-wedding
Marriage in the Catholic Church